Visa requirements for Myanmar citizens are administrative entry restrictions by the authorities of other states placed on citizens of Myanmar. As of 28 September 2019, Myanmar citizens had visa-free or visa on arrival access to 46 countries and territories, ranking the Myanmar passport 95th in terms of travel freedom according to the Henley Passport Index. Myanmar is also a part of ASEAN and has visa-free access to all other ASEAN states besides Malaysia.

Recent changes
On 6 September 2017, India has announced e-visa for citizens of Myanmar.

Visa requirements map

Visa requirements

See also

Visa policy of Myanmar
Myanmar passport
Foreign relations of Myanmar

References and Notes
References

Notes

Myanmar
Foreign relations of Myanmar